The 2019–20 SPHL season was the 16th season of the Southern Professional Hockey League (SPHL). Like most other events at the time, the season was cancelled before its conclusion in March 2020 due to the COVID-19 pandemic.

League business

Team changes
For the first time since the 2012–13 SPHL season, there were no changes to the league membership.

Regular season

Standings
Final standings:

‡ William B. Coffey Trophy winners
 Qualified to advance to playoffs

President's Cup playoffs
For 2020, the top eight teams at the end of the regular season would have qualified for the playoffs. The league returned to the traditional highest seed versus lowest seed format for all rounds, replacing the "challenge round" used in the previous two seasons where the top three seeds choose their opponent from the bottom four qualifiers. As a result of the league shutdown, there was no playoffs in 2020.

Awards

All-SPHL selections

References

External links
Southern Professional Hockey League website

Southern Professional Hockey League seasons
Sphl
SPHL